Podura fuscata is a species of springtail in the genus Podura.

References

Animals described in 1854
Collembola